International Short Stories is a three-volume anthology of outstanding English, American, and French short stories and novellae of the 18th, 19th, and early 20th centuries. It was published by P.F. Collier & Son in 1910. The first volume features celebrated short fiction from the United States, the second volume of England, and the third of France (translated into English). The three-volume series was compiled by Frances J. Reynolds, and edited by William Patten.

Contents

Volume I: American
"The Prophetic Pictures" by Nathaniel Hawthorne
"The Legend of Sleepy Hollow" by Washington Irving
"The Gold-Bug" by Edgar Allan Poe
"Corporal Flint's Murder" by James Fenimore Cooper
"Uncle Jim and Uncle Billy" by Bret Harte
"The Notary of Perigueux" by Henry Wadsworth Longfellow
"The Widow's Cruise" by Frank R. Stockton
"The Count and the Wedding Guest" by O. Henry
"Miss Tooker's Wedding Gift" by John Kendrick Bangs
"The Fable of the Two Mandolin Players and the Willing Performer" by George Ade
"The Fable of the Preacher Who Flew His Kite, But Not Because He Wished to Do So" by George Ade
"The Shadows on the Wall" by Mary E. Wilkins Freeman
"Major Perdue's Bargain" by Joel Chandler Harris
"A Kentucky Cinderella" by Francis Hopkinson Smith
"By the Waters of Paradise" by Francis Marion Crawford
"A Memorable Night" by Anna Katharine Green
"The Man from Red Dog" by Alfred Henry Lewis
"Jean Michaud's Little Ship" by Charles G.D. Roberts
"Those Old Lunes!" by William Gilmore Simms
"The Chiropodist" by Bayard Taylor
"Mr. Dooley on Corporal Punishment" by Finley Peter Dunne
"Over a Wood Fire" by Ik Marvel

Volume II: English
"The Two Drovers" by Sir Walter Scott
"Mr. Deuceace" by William Makepeace Thackeray
"The Brothers" by Edward Bulwer-Lytton
"Doctor Manette's Manuscript" by Charles Dickens
"The Caldron of Oil" by Wilkie Collins
"The Burial of the Tithe" by Samuel Lover
"The Knightsbridge Mystery" by Charles Reade
"The Courting of Dinah Shadd" by Rudyard Kipling
"The Sire de Maletroit's Door" by Robert Louis Stevenson
"The Secret of Goresthorpe Grange" by Arthur Conan Doyle
"A Change of Treatment" by W. W. Jacobs
"The Stickit Minister" by Samuel Rutherford Crockett
"The Lammas Preaching" by Samuel Rutherford Crockett
"An Undergraduate's Aunt" by F. Anstey
"The Silhouettes" by Arthur Quiller-Couch
"My Brother Henry" by J. M. Barrie
"Gilray's Flower Pot" by J. M. Barrie
"Mr. O'Leary's Second Love" by Charles Lever
"The Indifference of the Miller of Hofbau" by Anthony Hope Hawkins
"The Stolen Body" by H. G. Wells
"The Lazarette of the 'Huntress'" by William Clark Russell
"The Great Triangular Duel" by Frederick Marryat
"Three Thimbles and a Pea" by George Borrow

Volume III: French
"A Piece of Bread" by François Coppée
"The Elixir of Life" by Honoré de Balzac
"The Age for Love" by Paul Bourget
"Mateo Falcone" by Prosper Mérimée
"The Mirror" by Catulle Mendès
"My Nephew Joseph" by Ludovic Halévy
"A Forest Betrothal" by Erckmann-Chatrian
Zadig the Babylonian by Francois Marie Arouet de Voltaire
"Abandoned" by Guy de Maupassant
"The Guilty Secret" by Charles Paul de Kock
"Jean Monette" by Eugène François Vidocq
"Solange" by Alexandre Dumas
"The Birds in the Letter-box" by René Bazin
"Jean Gourdon's Four Days" by Émile Zola
"Baron de Trenck" by Antoinette Henriette Clémence Robert
"The Passage of the Red Sea" by Henry Murger
"The Woman and the Cat" by Marcel Prévost
"Gil Blas and Dr. Sangrado" by Alain-René Lesage
"A Fight with a Cannon" by Victor Hugo
"Tonton" by Adolphe Chenevière
"The Last Lesson" by Alphonse Daudet
"Croisilles" by Alfred de Musset
"The Vase of Clay" by Jean Aicard

See also
18th-century French literature
19th-century French literature
20th-century French literature
American literature
British literature

References

Further reading

External links

Project Gutenberg

Internet Archive

WorldCat

Others
  (all 3 volumes)

1910 anthologies
American anthologies
British anthologies
French anthologies
Fiction anthologies